The Lancaster Event Center is a public non-profit fairgrounds-style event complex located in Lincoln, Nebraska owned and operated by the Lancaster County Agricultural Society. The Lancaster Event Center was originally built to provide a permanent home for the Lancaster County Fair and other community events.  The Lancaster County Board supported the original two sets of bonds to build out the Lancaster Event Center first two phases and encouraged the Lancaster County Ag Society to keep the fairgrounds open for events year-round.

EVENT CENTER UTILIZATION. Now Lancaster Event Center has grown to be nationally recognized with over 320 events with 500,000 unique visitors who stay over 1.2 million visitor days for regional/national events like the 2nd largest indoor farm show and 2nd largest indoor tractor pull west of the Mississippi, a 10-state car swap meet and two of top 10 Quarter Horse shows in the US, while providing affordable space to over 200 local groups annually.

Other events at Lancaster Event Center include 4-H club meetings & level testing, trade shows, antique and craft shows, Lincoln City Libraries book sales, beer festivals, animal shows and agricultural events, rodeo events including the annual UNL College Regional Rodeo, car shows, indoor & outdoor motor sports competitions, themed people runs, gun shows, meetings, receptions, banquets, non-profit fundraisers and private events.

All buildings are multi-use, with no fixed seating, for people and animal events by converting dirt arenas to carpeted space each winter when all buildings are used year-round for over 320 events.  In 2014, it held over 270 events with approximately 558,765 people attending.

In Summer 2020, two international events will be hosted at the Lancaster Event Center for the first time—the National High School Finals Rodeo (NHSFR) which is the world's largest rodeo from a contestant perspective, and the Family Motor Coach Association (FMCA) International Convention and RV Expo.

IMPACT. In 2018, the University of Nebraska Bureau of Business Research completed an economic impact study showing outside of county visitors to Lancaster Event Center events bring nearly $40 million in annual impact.  The Lancaster Event Center published an Impact Report which was mailed to all county households in 2019.

THE SUPER FAIR. The Lancaster Event Center fairgrounds opened on February 1, 2001 and is the home of the Lancaster County Fair which became known as the Lancaster County Super Fair when extended to 10 days in 2010 upon the departure of the State Fair to Grand Island. The Lancaster County Super Fair has now grown from 5,000 attendees in borrowed buildings on the former Nebraska State Fairgrounds in Lincoln to now being the largest county fair in the State of Nebraska with over 120,000 visitors annually.  The Lancaster County Super Fair is celebrating its 150th anniversary in 2020.

HISTORY & MISSION OF THE AG SOCIETY. The Lancaster County Agricultural Society, which manages the Lancaster Event Center, was founded in 1867 as the Lancaster County Agricultural & Horticultural Society and re-formed as the Lancaster County Agricultural Society in 1870 as a separate, county-level subdivision under Nebraska law to help promote agriculture.  To this end, the Lancaster Event Center fairgrounds is home to local youth ag education programs that engage over 700 4-Hers/FFAers and over 10,000 schoolchildren annually at 60 youth agricultural events headlined by the annual Lancaster County Super Fair and the Annual Ag Literacy Festival organized by Lancaster County Extension.  There are many other agricultural business events each year as well such as the Nebraska Power Farming Show each December.

BUILD-OUT HISTORY.

In 2001, the fairgrounds opened Phase 1 of three planned phases with an initial price tag of $12 million:

 Multi-Purpose Arena now used for horse shows and trade & spectator shows
 Pavilion 1 multi-use building used for trade shows, overflow horse stalls (becomes the main livestock barn for the annual fair)
 Pavilion 2 horse stall barn with warm up arena (becomes trade show space for annual farm show)
 The Lincoln Room large reception space (home of static exhibits during the fair)
 A medium reception space called Exhibit Hall (home of small animal shows & static competitions during the fair)
Show offices and cafes/kitchens throughout.

Phase 2 in 2009 brought two additional buildings with a $10 million expansion:

 Pavilion 3 with an arena and cattle back pens used for horse shows including many that incorporate cattle such as roping (becomes trade show space during farm show)
 Pavilion 4, the largest building with 125,000-square feet including a dirt arena and a large concrete apron for display space.  This second arena is now known as the Amy Countryman Arena in Pavilion 4 with capacity for theater seating to 12,000.  (used for horse shows, spectator shows and trade shows)
Business Center which includes 3 meeting rooms and the main cafe/kitchen called the Good Times Grill.

Two hundred campsites with electric and multiple asphalt parking lots have been phased in over the years as well.

RELAUNCH. in 2014, the Lancaster County Ag Society hired a new Managing Director, Amy Dickerson. In 2015, the Lancaster Event Center began a multi-year relaunch of its operations and completed $2.7 million in remodeling/upgrades with proceeds from re-financing its remaining Phase 2 bonds which saved tax payers approx. $700,000 in interest over the life of the bonds.  These projects were overseen by the Lancaster County Fairgrounds Joint Public Agency (JPA) which consists of members from the Lancaster County Agricultural Society and the Lancaster County Board.

This relaunch was known as Phase 2.5 and major improvements included:

 Improved lighting in parking lots and multiple pavilions with brightness and energy-saving benefits
 Upgraded flooring in many people spaces and trade show carpeting
 Remodel main building entrances, main cafe facades
 Installation of state of art WiFi internet system throughout buildings and grounds to increase speed, capacity to match event growth, technology changes
 Digital screen with photo, video capability added to street sign to better communicate weekly events
 White "ranch-style" fencing to upgrade visitor appeal as well as provide crowd control
 Upgraded web site with automatically updated event calendar from event planning software

The Lancaster Event Center master plan is continually updated as the center has experienced increased size and variety of year-round event demands as well as dramatic growth of the annual county fair.  Current Phase 3 expansion plans are updated and maintained for public viewing including a 2019 Ad hoc Community Advisory Committee recommendations.

CURRENT IMPROVEMENTS. Starting in 2017, the Lancaster Event Center began grounds improvements set to open July 2020 to add:

 water to the existing 200 campsites
 add 1100 campsites with water/electric service to create a national event campground 1-2 times per year and serve as overflow parking year-round
 an expanded outdoor multi-use arena with a new covered grandstand with 3300-person capacity

These improvements were funded by $7 million in lodging visitor tax grants in large part with cost-effective self-perform labor by the Lancaster Event Center staff.

These grounds improvements on the undeveloped east side of the fairgrounds were designed initially to attract the National High School Finals Rodeo to Lincoln, Nebraska after a decade in two Wyoming facilities.  Lancaster Event Center was chosen in April 2017 to host the National High School Finals Rodeo in July 2020 & 2021 and in a subsequent bid process in January 2019 a return visit in July 2026 & 2027 was awarded as well.  The NHSFR is estimated to bring over $16 million of economic impact each year per Dr. Eric Thompson with UNL Bureau of Business Research.

Late in 2019 the FMCA (Family Motor Coach Association) International Convention & RV Expo in August 2020 chose to bring their largest annual convention to Lincoln bringing over $8–12 million of economic impact after a location in Syracuse NY fell through at the last minute.

AWARDS. The Lancaster Event Center has been recognized both locally and regionally:

 State of Nebraska Tourism Development Award for Ag Tourism (2018)
 Lincoln Chamber of Commerce Tourism Development Award (2018) 
 Lincoln Journal Star Inspire Award Finalist (2018) 
 Bullfighters of America (BOA) Indoor Event of the Year (2019)

External links
 Lancaster Event Center official web site {http://www.lancastereventcenter.org}
Lancaster County Super Fair official web site {http://www.SuperFair.org}
Lancaster Event Center calendar

References

Indoor arenas in Nebraska
Tourist attractions in Lincoln, Nebraska
Sports in Lincoln, Nebraska